Collix astathes is a moth in the family Geometridae. It was described by Prout in 1937. It is found on Bali.

References

astathes
Moths described in 1937
Taxa named by Louis Beethoven Prout